Angel Bernal (born February 26, 2005) is an American professional soccer player who plays as a right-back for USL Championship club FC Tulsa.

Club career
Bernal was born in Phoenix, Arizona, but grew up in San Antonio, Texas. He played as part of the San Antonio FC academy from 2016 to 2022. As an under-14 and under-15, Bernal participated in the Copa Rayados tournament in 2019, taking the team to the finals. In 2021, Bernal made his senior team debut in a friendly fixture against Liga MX club UNAM Pumas as a halftime substitute. In April 2022, Houston Dynamo invited Bernal to compete with them in the Generation Adidas Cup as a guest player. In September, he joined the FC Dallas academy, but only stayed two-months before signing a professional contract with USL Championship side FC Tulsa. Following the 2022 season, Bernal signed an extension at the club ahead of the upcoming 2023 season.

Career statistics

References

External links
 Profile at FC Tulsa

2005 births
Living people
American soccer players
Association football defenders
Soccer players from Texas
Sportspeople from San Antonio
FC Tulsa players
USL Championship players